WPGA may refer to:

Radio stations
 WDDO (AM), a radio station (980 AM) licensed to Perry, Georgia, United States, which held the call sign WPGA until 2016
 WNEX-FM, a radio station (100.9 FM) licensed to Perry, Georgia, which held the call sign WPGA-FM until 2015

Television stations
 WPGA-LD, a low-powered television station (channel 18, virtual 50) licensed to Macon, Georgia, United States
 WPGA-TV, a television station (channel 23, virtual 58) licensed to Perry, Georgia, United States

Golf
 WPGA, the Women's Professional Golf Association, the 1940s predecessor of the LPGA.
 WPGA, the Women's Professional Golfers' Association, founded in 1978 and now known as the Ladies European Tour